Zeliangrong people are one of the major indigenous Naga communities living in the tri-junction of Assam, Manipur and Nagaland in India. They are the descendants of 
Nguiba. The term "Zeliangrong" refers to the Zeme, Liangmai and Rongmei Naga tribes combined. Earlier, the term also covered the Inpui tribe. The descendants of Hoi of Makuilongdi (Makhel) were divided and were made peripheral appendages to three political entities - Manipur, Naga Hills (Nagaland) and the Dima Hasao (Northern Kachar) of Assam. The Zeliangrong may be classified as an ethno-cultural entity. The Zeliangrong belong to the larger Southern Mongoloid population and their language belongs to the Sino-Tibetan family of languages.

Etymology
The ethnonym ‘Zeliangrong’ is derived from 3 words ZE-LIANG-RONG. ZE from Zeme, LIANG from Liangmai and Rong from Rongmei. It traced back to the three kindred tribes. The three tribes are the Zeme (dwellers of the warmer) or Mejahme (lower region), Liangmai (men of the North) the original Northerner; on the other hand the term Rongmei (people settled in the south) and finally Inpui (Puimei). The word Zeliangrong was first coined on 15 February 1947 at Keishamthong Imphal. The terminology Zeliangrong was coined in coherence with the solidarity movement after India's independence.

Population
The population of Zeliangrong in Assam, Manipur and Nagaland is estimated to be around 3.7 lakhs. According to 2011 census data of India. In Nagaland state; Zeme and Liangmai numbers around 74,877. Whereas, In Manipur holds around 66,158. Hence, Rongmei holds a number of 170,908 in Manipur. Zeme Liangmai and Rongmei also settled in Dima Hasao region of Assam and other parts in Assam which holds to be in between 20 and 30 thousands.

Religion
The Zeliangrong worship the Supreme God  Haipou Tingkao Ragwang or Tingwang(as known by the Zeme and liangmei) and other sylvan Gods. But most of them got converted to Christianity due to its wave during the 1950s.

Region
The Zeliangrongs have been living in the present location of their land since time immemorial, in a compact and contiguous geographical setting of approximately 12,000 km2 lying between 93 degrees E and 94 degree E longitude and 94.40 degrees and 24 degrees N latitude in N. C Hills of Assam; Peren district of Nagaland; Tamenglong district, Senapati district, Kangvai subdivision of Churachanpur district, Jiribam subdivision of Imphal district, Imphal valley and Cachar District along with various villages and its adjoining slopes in Manipur. Earlier Manipur had only 9 districts but due to administrative changes, it led to formation of 7 new districts namely Kamjong, Kakching, Noney, Kangpokpi, Tengnoupal, Pherzawl and Jiribam.

See also
 Zeme Naga
 Liangmai Naga
 Rongmei Naga
 Heraka

References

External links
 Zeliangrong History (The Exodus)
 Introduction to Zeliangrong Nagas
 A brief account of the Zeliangrong People

Ethnic groups in Northeast India
Naga people